Gnaphosa dolosa is a ground spider species (family Gnaphosidae). It has a wide distribution in southern and eastern Europe, European Russia, and from Turkey to Central Asia.

See also 
 List of Gnaphosidae species

References

External links 

Gnaphosidae
Spiders of Europe
Spiders of Asia
Spiders described in 1879